Norhalis Shafik (born 1962) is a Singaporean football Defender who played for Singapore in the 1984 Asian Cup. He also played for Terengganu and Geylang International.

References

Living people
Singaporean footballers
Singapore international footballers
1984 AFC Asian Cup players
Southeast Asian Games silver medalists for Singapore
Southeast Asian Games medalists in football
Association football defenders
Competitors at the 1981 Southeast Asian Games
1962 births